Yaghnobi is an Eastern Iranian language spoken in the upper valley of the Yaghnob River in the Zarafshan area of Tajikistan by the Yaghnobi people. It is considered to be a direct descendant of Sogdian and has sometimes been called Neo-Sogdian in academic literature. There are some 12,500 Yaghnobi speakers, divided into several communities. The principal group lives in the Zafarobod area. There are also resettlers in the Yaghnob Valley. Some communities live in the villages of Zumand and Kůkteppa and in Dushanbe or its vicinity.

Most Yaghnobi speakers are bilingual in Tajik. Yaghnobi is mostly used for daily family communication, and Tajik is used by Yaghnobi-speakers for business and formal transactions. A Russian ethnographer was told by nearby Tajiks, long hostile to the Yaghnobis, who were late to adopt Islam, that the Yaghnobis used their language as a "secret" mode of communication to confuse the Tajiks. The account led to the belief by some that Yaghnobi or some derivative of it was used as a secret code.

There are two main dialects: a western and an eastern one. They differ primarily in phonetics. For example, historical *θ corresponds to t in the western dialects and s in the eastern: met – mes 'day' from Sogdian mēθ . Western ay corresponds to Eastern e: wayš – weš 'grass' from Sogdian wayš or wēš . The early Sogdian group θr (later ṣ̌) is reflected as sar in the east but tir in the west: saráy – tiráy 'three' from Sogdian θrē/θray or ṣ̌ē/ṣ̌ay . There are also some differences in verbal endings and the lexicon. In between the two main dialects is a transitional dialect that shares some features of both other dialects.

Writing
Yaghnobi was unwritten until the 1990s, but according to Andreyev, some of the Yaghnobi mullahs used the Arabic script for writing the language before 1928, mainly when they needed to hide some information from the Tajiks. Nowadays,  the language is transcribed by scholars using a modified Latin alphabet, with the following symbols:
a (á), ā (ā́), b, č, d, e (é), f, g, ɣ, h, ḥ, i (í), ī (ī́), ǰ, k, q, l, m (m̃), n (ñ), o (ó), p, r, s, š, t, u (ú), ū (ū́), ʏ (ʏ́), v, w (u̯), x, x̊, y, z, ž, ع

TITUS transcribes the alphabet thus: a (á), b, č, d, e (é), ĕ (ĕ́), ẹ (ẹ́), ẹ̆ (ẹ̆́), ə (ə́), f, g, ɣ, h, x̣, i (í), ĭ (ĭ́), ī (ī́), ǰ, k, q, l, m (m̃), n (ñ), o (ó), ọ (ọ́), p, r, s, š, t, u (ú), ŭ (ŭ́), ı̥ (í̥), v, u̯, x, x̊, y, z, ž, ع

In recent times, Sayfiddīn Mīrzozoda of the Tajik Academy of Sciences has used a modified Tajik alphabet for writing Yaghnobi. The alphabet is quite unsuitable for Yaghnobi, as it does not distinguish short and long vowels or v and w and it does not mark stress. Latin equivalents are given in parentheses:

А а (a), Б б (b), В в (v),  Ԝ ԝ (w), Г г (g), Ғ ғ (ɣ), Д д (d), Е е (e/ye), Ё ё (yo), Ж ж (ž), З з (z), И и (i, ī), Ӣ ӣ (ī), й (y), К к (k), Қ қ (q)
Л л (l), М м (m), Н н (n), О о (o), П п (p), Р р (r), С с (s), Т т (t), У у (u, ū, ʏ), Ӯ ӯ (ū, ʏ), Ф ф (f), Х х (x), Хԝ хԝ (x̊), Ҳ ҳ (h, ḥ), Ч ч (č), Ҷ ҷ (ǰ), Ш ш (š),  Ъ ъ (ع), Э э (e), Ю ю (yu, yū, yʏ), Я я (ya)

Cyrillic script
The Yaghnobi Alphabet was same as Tajik but with Ԝ.

Notes to Cyrillic:
 The letter й never appears at the beginning of a word. Words beginning with ya-, yo- and yu-/yū-/yʏ- are written as я-, ё- and ю-, and the combinations are written in the middle of the word: viyóra is виёра .
Perhaps ӣ is also used as a stress marker as it is also in Tajik, and ӯ can also be used in Tajik loanwords to indicate a Tajik vowel  , but it can have some other unknown use.
 In older texts, the alphabet did not use letters Ъ ъ and Э э. Later, the letters were integrated into the alphabet so the older  was changed into  to represent the pronunciation  (and not ).
 Russian letters Ц ц, Щ щ, Ы ы and Ь ь, which can be used in Tajik loans from Russian, are not used in Yaghnobi. The word concert is borrowed from Russian   in the form  ). Compare with Tajik .
 According to Sayfiddīn Mīrzozoda, the distinction between sounds  and  needs to be established. W w would be the best choice. For , Хw хw should be used. Mīrzozoda uses w in some texts, but it is inconsistent.

In his later works (e. g. the textbook Йағнобӣ зивок from 2007), Mīrzozoda does not use the letters я, ю, and ё, replacing them by йа, йу, and йо.

Phonology
Yaghnobi includes 9 monophthongs (3 short, 6 long), 8 diphthongs, and 27 consonants.

Vowels

 The monophthongs have these allophonic variants:
 : 
 : 
 : 
 : 
 : 
 : 
 : 
 : 
 : 
  was the result of compensatory lengthening.
  is only recognised by some authorities. It seems that  is unstable, and it is not recorded in all varieties of Yaghnobi. By summary: *ū́ (under stress) > ū/ūy/uy/ʏ or ū, *ō > ū (  "goat";). 
"Tajikistan",   "name".
  is considered as a long vowel, however before , its pronunciation is somewhat shorter, and is realised as a half-short (or even short) vowel. Etymologically, the "short" e before  comes from older *i (there is an alternation e/i before ) if the historical cluster *ih or *iع appears in a closed syllable, and *i changes to e. In open syllables, the change did not take place (that is similar to Tajik). The change can be seen in the verb dih-/deh-: infinitive  vs. 3rd sg. present .
The later change appears also in morphology: verb tifárak (the form is same in all three dialects) has form in 3rd sg. present tufórči < *təfár- < *tfar- < *θβar-. The alternation  can be seen also in Tajik loans where an unstressed vowel can undergo this change: W./Tr. širī́k vs. E. šarī́k < Tajik  /šarīk/ "partner", W./Tr. xipár vs. E. xapár < Tajik  /xabar/ "news". The former svarabhakti vowels are often ultra-short or reduced in pronunciation, and they can even disappear in fast speech: xišáp /xišáp vs. xⁱšáp vs. xšap/ < *xəšáp < *xšap.
The change takes place with all verbs of Yaghnobi origin and also with older loans from Tajik. For new loans, a remains unchanged.: gudár(ak) : gudórči vs. pár(ak) : párči: the first verb is an old loan from Tajik guzaštan < guδaštan, the later a recent loan from parrīdan.

Consonants

  appears as an allophone between vowels or voiced consonants.
 All voiced consonants are pronounced voiceless at the end of the word when after an unvoiced consonant comes a voiced one. Likewise, unvoiced consonants become voiced by assimilation.
Native words with those sounds are rare and mostly onomatopoeic.

Morphology
W, E and Tr. refer to the Western, Eastern and Transitional dialects.

Noun
Case endings:

Examples:
 kat : obl.sg. káti, pl. katt, obl.pl. kátti
 mayn (W) / men (E) : obl.sg. máyni/méni, pl. maynt/ment, obl.pl. máynti/ménti
 póda : obl.sg. póday/póde, pl. pódot, obl.pl. pódoti
 čalló : obl.sg. čallóy, pl. čallót, obl.pl. čallóti
 zindagī́ : obl.sg. zindagī́y, pl. zindagī́t, obl.pl. zindagī́ti
 mórti : obl.sg. mórtiy, pl. mórtit, obl.pl. mórtiti
 Also, the izofa construction is used in Yaghnobi and appears in phrases and constructions adopted from Tajik or with words of Tajik origin.

Pronouns

The second person plural, šumóx is also used as the polite form of the second person pronoun.

Numerals

Verb
Personal endings – present:

Personal endings – preterite (with augment a-):

By adding the ending -išt (-št after a vowel; but -or+išt > -ošt) to the preterite, the durative preterite is formed.

The present participle is formed by adding -na to the verbal stem. Past participle (or perfect participle) is formed by addition of -ta to the stem.

The infinitive is formed by addition of ending -ak to the verbal stem.

Negation is formed by prefix na-, in combination with augment in preterite it changes to nē-.

The copula is this:

Lexicon

Knowledge of Yaghnobi lexicon comes from three main works: from a Yaghnobi-Russian dictionary presented in Yaghnobi Texts by Andreyev and Peščereva and then from a supplementary word list presented in Yaghnobi Grammar by Xromov. The last work is Yaghnobi-Tajik Dictionary compiled by Xromov's student, Sayfiddīn Mīrzozoda, himself a Yaghnobi native speaker. Yaghnobi Tajik words represent the majority of the lexicon (some 60%), followed by words of Turkic origin (up to 5%, mainly from Uzbek) and a few Russian words (about 2%; through the Russian language, also many international words came to Yaghnobi). Only a third of the lexicon is of Eastern-Iranian origin and can be easily comparable to those known from Sogdian, Ossetian, the Pamir languages or Pashto.

Sample texts

An anecdote about Nasreddin

Notes

References
  М. С. Андреев, Е. М. Пещерева, Ягнобские тексты с приложением ягнобско-русского словаря, Москва – Ленинград 1957.
(M. S. Andrejev, Je. M. Peščereva, Jagnobskije teksty s priloženijem jagnobsko-russkogo slovarja, Moskva – Leningrad 1957) (in Russian)

 М. Н. Боголюбов, Ягнобский (новосогдийский) язык. Исследование и материалы. Автореферат на соискание ученой степени доктора филологических наук, Ленинград 1956
(M. N.Bogoljubov, Jagnobskij /novosogdijskij/ jazyk. Issledovanija i materialy. Avtoreferat na soiskanije učenoj stepeni doktora filologičeskix nauk, Leningrad 1956) (in Russian)
 М. Н. Боголюбов: Ягнобский язык. In. В. В. Виноградов (ed.): Языки народов СССР. Том первый: Индоевропейские языки. Москва, 1966, 342–361.
(M. N. Bogoljubov: Jagnobskij jazyk. In: V. V. Vinogradov (ed.): Jazyki narodov SSSR. Tom pervyj: Indojevropejskije jazyki. Moskva, 1966, p. 342–361) (in Russian)

 С. Мирзозода, Яғнобӣ зивок, Душанбе 1998.
(S. Mirzozoda, Yaɣnobī zivok, Dušanbe 1998) (in Tajik)

 С. Мирзозода, Луғати яғнобӣ – тоҷикӣ, Душанбе 2002.
(S. Mirzozoda, Luɣat-i yaɣnobī – tojikī, Dušanbe 2002) (in Tajik)

 Ľ. Novák: Jaghnóbsko-český slovník s přehledem jaghnóbské gramatiky. Яғнобӣ-чехӣ луғат яғнобӣ зивоки дастури феҳрастипӣ. Praha (: Filozofická fakulta Univerzity Karlovy v Praze), 2010. 
(Ľ. Novák: Yaghnobi-Czech Dictionary with an Outline of Yaghnobi Grammar. Praha 2010) (in Czech)
  А. Л. Хромов, Ягнобский язык, Москва 1972.
(A. L. Xromov, Jagnobskij jazyk, Moskva 1972) (in Russian)
  А. Л. Хромов, Ягнобский язык, In: В. С. Расторгуева (ed.): Основы иранского языкознания. Новоиранские языки II. – Восточная группа. Москва 1987, p. 644-701.
(A. L. Xromov, Jagnobskij jazyk. In. V. S. Rastorgujeva (ed.): Osnovy iranskogo jazykoznanija. Novoiranskije jazyki II. – Vostočnaja gruppa.  Moskva 1987, p. 644–701.) (in Russian)

External links

 http://www.eki.ee/books/redbook/yaghnabis.shtml
 https://web.archive.org/web/20060622003001/http://iles.umn.edu/faculty/bashiri/Tajling%20folder/yaghnob.html
 Yaghnobi blog & online Yaghnobi-Tajik-English lexicon

Eastern Iranian languages
Languages of Tajikistan
Yaghnob